Peter Andrelczyk (born November 10, 1985) is an American professional baseball pitcher who is currently a free agent. He was previously in the Miami Marlins organization. Before beginning his professional career, he played college baseball at Coastal Carolina University. He has also competed for the United States national baseball team.

Career
Andrelczyk attended Manheim Township High School in Manheim Township of Lancaster County, Pennsylvania. Undrafted out of high school, Andrelczyk enrolled at Coastal Carolina University, where he played college baseball for the Coastal Carolina Chanticleers baseball team in the Big South Conference of NCAA Division I. A relief pitcher, Andrelczyk served as the team's closer.

He was selected by the Baltimore Orioles in the 32nd round (968th overall) of the 2007 Major League Baseball draft, but did not sign, opting to return to Coastal Carolina for his senior season. He was selected by the Marlins in the fifth round (148th overall) of the 2008 MLB draft, and signed. He made his professional debut with the Jamestown Jammers of the Class-A Short Season New York–Penn League, before being promoted to the Greensboro Grasshoppers of the Class-A South Atlantic League, in 2008. He played for the Grasshoppers and Jupiter Hammerheads of the Class-A Advanced Florida State League in 2009. He began the 2010 season in Jupiter, and was promoted to the Jacksonville Suns of the Class-AA Southern League that season. He started the 2011 season in Jacksonville, before receiving a promotion to the New Orleans Zephyrs of the Class-AAA Pacific Coast League.

Andrelczyk played for the United States national baseball team in the 2011 Baseball World Cup and 2011 Pan American Games, winning the silver medal.

References

External links

1985 births
Living people
Baseball pitchers
Baseball players at the 2011 Pan American Games
Baseball players from Pennsylvania
Coastal Carolina Chanticleers baseball players
Greensboro Grasshoppers players
Jacksonville Suns players
Jamestown Jammers players
Jupiter Hammerheads players
Lancaster Barnstormers players
Leones de Ponce players
New Orleans Zephyrs players
Pan American Games medalists in baseball
Pan American Games silver medalists for the United States
Phoenix Desert Dogs players
Sportspeople from Lancaster, Pennsylvania
United States national baseball team players
Medalists at the 2011 Pan American Games